Gods and Kings may refer to:

Gods and Kings, 1945 collection of six one-act plays by Lajos Bíró 
Gods and Kings, Christian historical fiction novel by Lynn Austin
 Civilization V: Gods & Kings, a videogame
Gods and Kings: The Rise and Fall of Alexander McQueen and John Galliano, a 2015 book

See also
Exodus: Gods and Kings, 2014 epic biblical drama film directed by Ridley Scott